Munch is a Danish and Norwegian surname, meaning "monk". It may also sometimes be a variant of the German surname Münch, meaning the same. Notable people with this surname include the following:
 Adolph Munch, American businessman and politician
 Charles Munch (conductor) (1891–1968), Alsatian symphonic conductor and violinist
 Charles Munch (painter) (born 1945), American artist
 Edvard Munch (1863–1944), Norwegian painter best known for The Scream
 Emil D. Munch, American businessman and politician
 Peter A. Munch (1908–1984), Norwegian-American sociologist, educator and author
 Peter Andreas Munch (1810–1863), Norwegian medieval historian
 Peter Rochegune Munch (1870–1948), Danish historian and politician

Danish-language surnames
Norwegian-language surnames